Pseudotabanus is a genus of horse flies in the family Tabanidae.

Species
Pseudotabanus carbo (Macquart, 1850)
Pseudotabanus alcocki (Summers, 1912)
Pseudotabanus ater (Taylor, 1917)
Pseudotabanus burnsi (Mackerras, 1961)
Pseudotabanus dereckii Trojan, 2002
Pseudotabanus distinctus Ricardo, 1915
Pseudotabanus equinus (Ferguson & Hill, 1922)
Pseudotabanus eyreanus (Mackerras, 1961)
Pseudotabanus fergusoni (Ricardo, 1917)
Pseudotabanus frontalis (Ricardo, 1915)
Pseudotabanus fulvissimus (Mackerras, 1961)
Pseudotabanus fuscipennis (Ricardo, 1917)
Pseudotabanus grandis (Ricardo, 1917)
Pseudotabanus lunulatus (Bigot, 1892)
Pseudotabanus nigripennis (Ricardo, 1917)
Pseudotabanus obscurus (Mackerras, 1961)
Pseudotabanus peregrinus (Mackerras, 1964)
Pseudotabanus pullus (Mackerras, 1961)
Pseudotabanus queenslandi Ricardo, 1915
Pseudotabanus silvester (Bergroth, 1894)
Pseudotabanus taylori (Mackerras, 1961)
Pseudotabanus trypherus (Taylor, 1916)

References

Brachycera genera
Tabanidae
Diptera of Australasia